The El Dorado Fire was a wildfire that burned  in the San Bernardino and Riverside Counties of California in September to November 2020. It was ignited on September 5 by a pyrotechnic device at a gender reveal party in El Dorado Ranch Park, and quickly spread to the San Gorgonio Wilderness Area of the San Bernardino National Forest. Burning over a 71-day period, the fire destroyed 20 structures and resulted in one firefighter fatality, for which the couple hosting the party were charged with involuntary manslaughter.

Cause
The fire began at 10:23 AM (PDT) on September 5, 2020, when Refugio Manuel Jimenez Jr. and Angela Renee Jimenez set off a smoke bomb at a gender reveal photoshoot at the El Dorado Ranch Park near Yucaipa, in southern San Bernardino County. The detonation of the smoke bomb lit nearby dry grass on fire, which then began to spread rapidly. According to the California Department of Forestry and Fire Protection (CAL FIRE), the Jimenezes attempted to extinguish the fire with bottled water, then reported the fire to the authorities and cooperated with their investigation. The cause of the fire inspired widespread mockery and condemnation against gender reveal parties, and was frequently compared to the 2017 Sawmill Fire, conceived by an exploding target at a gender reveal party in Arizona.

Fire
In response to the fire's spread, California Governor Gavin Newsom declared a state of emergency in San Bernardino County, and evacuations were ordered in Mountain Home Village, Oak Glen, Forest Falls, and Yucaipa. A  stretch of California State Route 38 and the San Gorgonio Wilderness Area of the San Bernardino National Forest (SBNF) were closed.

Firefighters halted its advance south, though evacuation notices were issued to residents of Riverside County, to the south of San Bernardino County, and the SBNF was closed.

In spite of winds, continued high temperatures, and low humidity, firefighters made enough progress containing the spread of the El Dorado Fire to allow for the lifting of evacuation orders in Yucaipa and Oak Glen on September 10, September 11, September 12, and September 13, and Riverside County on September 10. Angelus Oaks and Forest Falls were evacuated at the same time, however, and residents of Big Bear were advised to evacuate.

While U.S. Forest Service Hotshot crews conducted controlled burns near Angelus Oaks on September 17, wind gusts created local fires that resulted in the death of a firefighter. On September 18, residents of Forest Falls and Mountain Home Village were allowed to return to their homes. Containment of the El Dorado Fire reached 93% on September 28, and it continued to burn until November 16.

Aftermath
The El Dorado Fire burned  over 71 days, reaching its greatest extent by September 29, and cost $42,269,660 to suppress. The fire resulted in the death of a single firefighter and 13 other injuries. 20 buildings were destroyed. State Route 38 was reopened on September 29, 2020. Some areas of the SBNF remained closed until April 2022.

Environmental consequences
The El Dorado Fire burned steep mountain terrain already prone to landslide, rockfall, and debris flow hazards. Landslides and rockfalls began in September 2020 as the fire eroded the soil of its burn scar, and plagued San Bernardino County during and after its duration. Storms and the threat of mudflows triggered evacuation orders and advisories for communities in San Bernardino and Riverside Counties in January 2021, July 2021, December 2021, and September 2022.

Legal prosecution
The San Bernardino County District Attorney's Office began assembling a case for the prosecution of the Jimenezes in January 2021. The couple were formally charged with involuntary manslaughter, a felony, among other felony and misdemeanor charges on July 20, 2021, and pleaded not guilty. The Jimenezes requested the dismissal of all charges against them in December 2021 and again in October 2022. However the judge denied the dismissal of most of the charges both times.

See also

2020 California wildfires

References

Wildfires in San Bernardino County, California
Wildfires in Riverside County, California
2020 California wildfires
Death in Riverside County, California
September 2020 events in the United States
San Bernardino National Forest
San Bernardino Mountains